The Men's Junior Pan-American Volleyball Cup is a bi-annual Continental Cup organized by NORCECA for U21 teams from South-, North- and Central America, and the Caribbean.

This tournament also serves as qualifier to U21 World Championship.

History

Medal table

MVP by edition
2011 – 
2015 – 
2017 – 
2018 – 
2018 –

See also
 Men's Pan-American Volleyball Cup
 Men's U23 Pan-American Volleyball Cup
 Boys' Youth Pan-American Volleyball Cup
 Women's Junior Pan-American Volleyball Cup

References

External links
 NORCECA

Pan-American Volleyball Cup
Men's Pan-American Volleyball Cup
Recurring sporting events established in 2011
2011 establishments in North America
2011 establishments in South America